Angela Crawley (born 3 June 1987) is a Scottish National Party politician. She was first elected as the Member of Parliament (MP) for Lanark and Hamilton East at the 2015 general election. Crawley has served as the SNP Shadow Attorney General since 2021. She was previously the SNP spokesperson for Women and Equalities and a member of the House of Commons Women and Equalities Committee.

Early life and career
Born in Hamilton, Crawley attended John Ogilvie High School. She studied Politics at the University of Stirling, graduating with a BA degree. She then spent several years living and working in Brighton for the Educational Travel Group. After being elected to Parliament,  she received an LLB degree in law from the University of Glasgow.

She first stood for election to South Lanarkshire Council for the Hamilton South ward and was elected at the 2012 local elections with 1,255 first preferences and taking the second seat in the ward, exceeding the quota.

In 2014, she was appointed as the National Convenor of the SNP's youth wing, Young Scots for Independence; also sitting on the party's National Executive Committee.

In 2017, Crawley was named in the Forbes 30 Under 30 list for her work in Parliament. She very narrowly retained her Hamilton East and Lanark seat at the 2017 snap general election.

In December 2016, Crawley stated in Parliament her view that "the law must be updated to recognise an individual's gender identity, which has nothing to do with their birth gender and everything to do with the gender they believe they are". Conservative MP Ben Howlett described Crawley in his response "as a great champion on trans issues".

Crawley has prioritised campaigning on LGBTQ+ Equality in Parliament. On 27 February 2017, she launched a new campaign for transgender and non binary equality. This involved her setting up a petition. In 2022, Crawley led a debate on 50 Years of Pride in the UK, stating that "trans people in 2022 are facing the same hate crime and discrimination that many of the LGBTI community faced in the 1980s," and asserting that LGBTQ+ rights are human rights.

Crawley has called for victims of domestic abuse to be exempted from the child maintenance charge, and wrote a letter to the then Home Secretary Amber Rudd on the issue in 2018.

In 2021, Crawley launched a campaign for paid miscarriage leave in the UK including the introduction of a Private Members Bill on the issue along with a national petition. She reintroduced the Private Members Bill in the 2022 Parliament.

On 15 June 2022, Crawley lead a debate in Westminster on the merits of introducing a universal basic income (UBI).

Personal life
In February 2016, she was included in The Independent's group photograph of 28 LGBT MPs and peers.

References

External links 

 profile on SNP website

 

1987 births
Living people
People educated at John Ogilvie High School
Alumni of the University of Glasgow
Alumni of the University of Stirling
Female members of the Parliament of the United Kingdom for Scottish constituencies
Lesbian politicians
LGBT members of the Parliament of the United Kingdom
Scottish LGBT politicians
Members of the Parliament of the United Kingdom for Scottish constituencies
Scottish National Party councillors
Scottish National Party MPs
UK MPs 2015–2017
UK MPs 2017–2019
UK MPs 2019–present
21st-century Scottish women politicians
21st-century Scottish politicians
Councillors in South Lanarkshire
Politicians from Hamilton, South Lanarkshire
21st-century Scottish LGBT people
Women councillors in Scotland